Marianne Fortier (born 2 November 1993 in Quebec City, Quebec) is a Canadian actress. Her breakthrough came with a leading role in the film Aurore.

Filmography
 2005: Aurore : Aurore 
 2006: À mère et marée (short film) : Cinthia
 2008: Une grenade avec ça? (one episode) : Daphnée
 2008: Mommy Is at the Hairdresser's (Maman est chez le coiffeur) (film) : Élise
 2009: La Galère, Saison 2, 3, 4 et 5 (TV Series) : Raphaëlle
 2011: Trauma : Mélanie Courtois
 2013: 1er Amour
 2019: La Faille (season 1, TV series) : Raphaëlle Fournier
 2021: Brain Freeze
 2022: Pour Sarah
 2022: In Broad Daylight (Au grand jour)

Awards 
 Nominated for Best Actress at the 2006 Genie Award
 Won, Best Actress in a Canadian Film, Vancouver Film Critics Circle Awards 2009

References 

1993 births
Actresses from Quebec City
Canadian child actresses
Canadian film actresses
Canadian television actresses
French Quebecers
Living people